WTRE 1330 AM is a radio station broadcasting a country music format. Licensed to Greensburg, Indiana, the station is owned by WTRE, Inc.

References

External links
WTRE's official website

TRE (AM)